Harley Jessup (born 1954) is an American production designer and visual effects art director who has been nominated for two visual effects Academy Awards, and won once. Currently working at Pixar Animation Studios, Jessup has served as production designer for Monsters, Inc. (with Bob Pauley), Ratatouille, Cars 2, Presto, The Good Dinosaur and Pixar's animated feature, Coco. Before coming to Pixar, Jessup was production designer on Walt Disney Pictures' James and the Giant Peach.

Jessup was a visual effects art director at Industrial Light & Magic from 1987 to 1994. From 1991 to 1994 he served as ILM art department creative director. Jessup's visual effects art direction credits include, Innerspace (for which he won an Academy Award), Hook (nominated for an Academy Award), The Hunt for Red October (with Steve Beck), Ghostbusters II, Joe Versus the Volcano and Fire in the Sky.

In 1985, Jessup won an Emmy Award for best visual effects for The Ewok Adventure, produced by Lucasfilm, Ltd. for ABC Television.

Harley Jessup began his career at Korty Films designing animated short films for Sesame Street, including The Adventures of Thelma Thumb. He served as art director on John Korty's animated feature Twice Upon a Time.

Jessup has written and illustrated three children's books, What Alice Up to? and Grandma Summer for Viking Children's Books and Welcome to Monstropolis for Disney/Egmont. He studied graphic design at Oregon State University (BFA) and Stanford University (MFA).

Oscars
Both films were in the category of Best Visual Effects

 60th Academy Awards: Innerspace. Award shared with Bill George, Dennis Muren and Kenneth F. Smith. Won.
 64th Academy Awards: Nominated for Hook, nomination was shared with Eric Brevig, Michael Lantieri and Mark Sullivan. Lost to Terminator 2: Judgment Day.

Selected filmography

Twice Upon a Time (1983) art director
Howard the Duck (1986) assistant production designer
Innerspace (1987) visual effects art director
Ghostbusters II (1989) visual effects art director
The Hunt for Red October (1990) visual effects art director
Hook (1991) visual effects art director
James and the Giant Peach (1996) production designer
A Bug's Life (1998) additional storyboard artist
Monsters, Inc. (2001) production designer
Ratatouille (2007) production designer
Up (2009) lighting art director
Cars 2 (2011) production designer
The Good Dinosaur (2015) production designer
Coco (2017) production designer
Luca (2021) additional production design

References

External links

1954 births
Annie Award winners
Best Visual Effects Academy Award winners
Emmy Award winners
Living people
People from Corvallis, Oregon
Pixar people
Special effects people